Qatar is a country in the Middle East.

Qatar may also refer to:

 Qatar, East Azerbaijan, Iran
 Qatar, West Azerbaijan, Iran
Qatar Airways, the state-owned flag carrier of Qatar
Qatar SC, a sports club based in Doha, Qatar

See also
 Katar (disambiguation)
 Qatar-e Olya, Ardabil Province, Iran
 Qatar-e Sofla, Ardabil Province, Iran